"Something Better" is a song by American DJ and electronic music producer Audien from his debut EP, Daydreams, featuring vocals by American country music trio Lady Antebellum. The song was written by Audien, Peter Hanna and Taylor Bird, and produced by Audien.

The song was released to digital retailers through Astralwerks on July 10, 2015 as the EP's second single. On September 1, 2015 it was serviced to American contemporary hit radio via Astralwerks and Capitol Records. The song reached the top of the US Billboard Hot Dance Club Songs chart dated September 26, 2015.

Background
On June 10, 2015, Lady Antebellum performed with DJ and producer Zedd at the year's CMT Music Awards with a mashup of their then-current single "Long Stretch of Love" and Zedd's "Beautiful Now". They revealed to Entertainment Tonight on the red carpet for the event that the performance was "a little bit of a preview" for a crossover song they were releasing with Audien later that summer ("Something Better").

Audien approached Lady Antebellum to record the vocals for the song due to its call-and-response structure and potential for harmonies, characteristics common to the trio's music. He also noted that the group were "some of the best voices ... in overall music" and described the song to Entertainment Weekly as "simply my favorite thing I've ever done." Lady Antebellum member Charles Kelley explained that the group "knew [they] wanted to be part of [the song]" from the first time they heard it as they were "immediately drawn to its great melody and powerful lyric."

The band was open to pushing the boundaries of country music with the song, noting that they had questioned how well their 2010 pop rock-leaning single, "Our Kind of Love", would be received by country radio when it was first released. "We'll always stay true to the country genre," Kelley assured fans, "but that doesn't mean we can't have a little fun."

Critical reception
 Laura McClellan of Taste of Country praised the vocal performances of Lady Antebellum's Hillary Scott and Charles Kelley on the track and described "Something Better" as a "driving, dance-y pop tune you won’t be able to get out of your head." 
 Christina Vinson of Taste of Country'''s sister site The Boot complimented Lady Antebellum for "[pushing] boundaries," noting that the song proves the trio is "not just a top-notch country group," but "a top-notch group, period."
 Jon Freeman of Rolling Stone'' said that "Hillary Scott and Charles Kelley [of Lady Antebellum] repurpose their signature boy-girl vocals here". He describes the song as "a pop-savvy, piano-driven melody with build-and-release tension that explodes into emotive instrumental passages".

Music video
An accompanying video premiered November 14, 2015 and features a young man who encounters a woman implied to be an alien who is on the run from the authorities. He takes the woman back to his farm, where she reveals special abilities, before the police arrive and the woman is beamed back up into space. Xa -12- 43672

Laura McClellan praised the video for combining "equal parts sci-fi and Americana," representing the song's blending of electronic and music genres.

Track listings
 Digital download – single
 "Something Better" – 3:33

 Digital download – remixes

Chart performance

Weekly charts

Year-end charts

Release history

See also
 List of number-one dance singles of 2015 (U.S.)

References

2015 songs
2015 singles
Lady A songs
Astralwerks singles
Capitol Records singles
Electronic dance music songs
Songs written by Audien
Audien songs
Songs written by Peter Hanna
Songs written by Taylor Bird (songwriter)